Kina Reusch (1940–1988) was a Canadian artist based in Montreal, Quebec.

Resuch's work Torii was part of the Corridart exhibition during the 1976 Montreal Olympics, which was taken down after six days by the City of Montreal. In 1977 Reusch was hired as the director of Montreal's Galerie Powerhouse, a presentation centre dedicated to art made by women.

Her work is included in the collections of the National Gallery of Canada  and the Musée national des beaux-arts du Québec. Her personal papers are held in the library of Concordia University, Montreal.

References

20th-century Canadian women artists
1940 births
1988 deaths
Artists from Montreal